The informally named Casper octopus species were first discovered in 2016 in the Pacific Ocean, in water off Hawaii. The two distinct Casper species are new to science but have not yet been formally named with a binomial name as no specimens have yet been collected - they are only known from imagery.

The species gains their informal name from the ghostly white colouring, reminiscent of that of the cartoon character Casper the Friendly Ghost, which scientists think may be a result of lack of pigment in their food. They have short arms, and lack the 'ears' found in the deep-sea Grimpoteuthis species (nicknamed the Dumbo octopuses).

Specimens were observed on footage obtained at depths of 4,290 metres (2.6 miles). It is thought that the females lay their eggs on sea sponges.

References

External links
https://www.science.org/content/article/ghost-octopus-has-heartbreaking-parenting-strategy

Octopuses
Molluscs of the Pacific Ocean